The Grammy Award for Best Country & Western Recording was awarded from 1959 to 1968.  From 1959 to 1961 the award was presented as the Grammy Award for Best Country & Western Performance.  1965 and 1966 the award category was called Best Country & Western Single.  This award was the lone country music Grammy category from 1959 to 1964. 

Years reflect the year in which the Grammy Awards were presented, for works released in the previous year.

Recipients

References

Grammy Awards for country music